= HD 128198 =

Star in the constellation Boötes

Observation data Epoch J2000 Equinox ICRS
- Constellation: Boötes
- Right ascension: 14^{h} 34^{m} 38.4998^{s}
- Declination: +36° 37′ 33.829″
- Apparent magnitude (V): 6.1657

Characteristics
- Evolutionary stage: red giant branch
- Spectral type: K4III
- U−B color index: +1.59
- B−V color index: +1.38

Astrometry
Radial velocity (R_{v})	−9.88±0.20 km/s
Proper motion (μ)	RA: −24.973 mas/yr Dec.: −46.654 mas/yr
Parallax (π)	5.9435±0.0293 mas
Distance	549 ± 3 ly (168.3 ± 0.8 pc)
Absolute magnitude (M_{V})	+0.07

Details
Mass	2.6 M_{☉}
Radius	24 R_{☉}
Luminosity	214 L_{☉}
Surface gravity (log g)	2.01 cgs
Temperature	4,420 K
Metallicity [Fe/H]	−0.11±0.09 dex
Age	558 Myr

Other designations
- BD+37°2551, HD 128198, HIP 71277, HR 5448, SAO 64227

Database references
SIMBAD	data

HD 128198 is a giant star in the northern constellation of Boötes, about 549 light years away.
